WvDial (pronounced 'weave-dial') is a utility that helps in making modem-based connections to the Internet that is included in some Linux distributions. WvDial is a Point-to-Point Protocol dialer: it dials a modem and starts pppd in order to connect to the Internet. It uses the wvstreams library.

WvDial uses heuristics to guess how to dial and log into a server, alleviating the need to write a login script.

Graphical frontends

There are some GUI tools which allows using WvDial:
 GNOME-PPP, a GUI dialer for GNOME
 kppp, a GUI dialer for KDE
 , a dialer based on PyGTK
 QtWvDialer based on Qt, by Matthias Toussaint
 x-wvdial, that uses xmessage

See also

 Hayes command set
 ifconfig
 NetworkManager
 pppconfig
 Point-to-Point Protocol daemon
 USB modem

References

External links
  
 wvdial Email list 
 WvDial FAQ 
 
 
 
 
 
 Using wvdial with a SecurID one-shot password
 Chestnut, an alternative dialer
 eznet, an alternative to WvDial
 OpenNMS Notification usage example

Free network-related software
Unix software